Stan Wright (born 29 September 1978) is a retired Cook Islands international rugby union player, who played in the prop position for Leinster, Blues and Stade Français.

Playing career
Stan's played for clubs such as the Marist Club in Whangarei, and for Northland in the Air New Zealand Cup where he played alongside Fijian flyer, Rupeni Caucaunibuca.  He was also part of the Auckland Blues squad for the 2006 Super 14 season, however, he was forced to withdraw due to injury.

Wright joined Irish side Leinster in December 2006 as an injury replacement for Will Green, after he was recommended to the club by Auckland scrum coach Mike Casey, who was a friend of the then Leinster forwards coach, Mike Brewer.  Wright proved himself to be a successful scrummager and eventually nailed himself down as the first choice prop for the club.

The following season, Stanley helped Leinster to their 2nd Magners League title win, with a number of impressive performances in the front row, he was rewarded for this by being selected in the '07/08 League Dream Team', along with six other players from Leinster. Wright won the IRUPA Sports 'Unsung Hero' award for his performances in the 2008-09 Magners League season.

Stanley won the 2009 and 2011 Heineken Cup with Leinster, before moving on to French side Stade Français.  He was extremely popular with the Leinster supporters and he earned the nickname 'Cookie Monster' because of his home nation, the Cook Islands.

Coaching career
Stan was appointed Forwards coach for the amateur Irish Rugby team, Suttonians RFC, for the 2009–2010 season.

In 2016, Stanley was hired as coach of the under 20's Cook Islands Rugby team.

Personal life
Stan's mother, Poila Wright (Mama Tuki) was awarded an OBE in 2007.

In 2011, Stan was the highest paid athlete from the Cook Islands.

Honours

Cups
Pro12
2008
European Rugby Champions Cup
2009
2011

Personal Honours
Magners League Dream Team for the 07–08 season.

References

1978 births
Living people
Cook Island Māori people
Rugby union props
Cook Island rugby union coaches
Cook Island rugby union players
Leinster Rugby players
People from Rarotonga
Ystradgynlais RFC players
Cook Island expatriate rugby union players
Expatriate rugby union players in France
Cook Island expatriate sportspeople in England
Cook Island expatriate sportspeople in France
Cook Islands international rugby union players
Expatriate rugby union players in England
Cook Island expatriate sportspeople in Ireland
Cook Island expatriate sportspeople in Wales